Koyukuk Airport  is a state-owned public-use airport located in Koyukuk, a city in the Yukon-Koyukuk Census Area of the U.S. state of Alaska.

As per Federal Aviation Administration records, this airport had 1,018 passenger boardings (enplanements) in calendar year 2007, a decrease of 22% from the 1,305 enplanements in 2006.

Facilities 
It has one runway (6/24) with a gravel and dirt surface measuring 4,000 x 75 ft (1,219 x 23 m). The runway was extended and widened from its former size of 3,000 by 60 feet.

Airlines and destinations 

The following airlines offer scheduled passenger service at this airport:

References

External links 
 FAA Alaska airport diagram (GIF)
 

Airports in the Yukon–Koyukuk Census Area, Alaska